The McCleary Elementary School (also known as McCleary Traditional Academy, and more recently as McCleary Early Childhood Center)  in  the Upper Lawrenceville neighborhood of Pittsburgh, Pennsylvania is a building from 1900. It was listed on the National Register of Historic Places in 1986.

The building was last used by Pittsburgh Public Schools during the 2011–12 school year as an early childhood education center. In 2013, the school was sold to a developer for $410,000. It was then renovated and converted to condominiums in 2015–17. The project also added a third story to the building.

References

School buildings on the National Register of Historic Places in Pennsylvania
Renaissance Revival architecture in Pennsylvania
School buildings completed in 1900
Schools in Pittsburgh
Pittsburgh History & Landmarks Foundation Historic Landmarks
National Register of Historic Places in Pittsburgh
Lawrenceville (Pittsburgh)
1900 establishments in Pennsylvania